Agiovlasitika is a village in Achaea, Greece. Agiovlasitika is in the municipality of West Achaea. It is located about 3 km southeast of Kato Achaia, and 20 km southwest of Patras. The river Peiros flows northeast of the village. Its population in 2011 was 84 for the village and 241 for the community, which consists of the villages Agiovlasitika, Kapeli, Lefkos and Stenaitika.

Population

See also
List of settlements in Achaea

References

External links
 Agiovlasitika GTP Travel Pages

Dymi, Achaea
Populated places in Achaea